Thomas Martin Clonan is an Irish senator, security analyst, author and retired Irish Army Captain. He was elected to Seanad Eireann in March 2022 in the 2022 Dublin University by-election.

Military career
Clonan grew up in Finglas, Dublin and attended St Kevin's College, Dublin school in Ballygall. He completed a Bachelor in Education degree at Trinity College Dublin, graduating in 1987, before joining the Irish Army as a cadet in 1989.

In 1995, Clonan deployed to South Lebanon as an officer commanding Irish troops under the United Nations Interim Force in Lebanon (UNIFIL) mission in that country. Clonan's deployment to Lebanon coincided with the Israeli punitive Operation 'Grapes of Wrath' against Hizbullah which culminated in the massacre of refugees at the village of Qana in April 1996.  Clonan has spoken about his experiences of conflict and trauma in RTÉ's documentary Peacekeepers (2016) and in his first book, Blood, Sweat and Tears (Liberties Press, 2012). He was also an OSCE election monitor in Bosnia during the Dayton Agreement in 1996. In this role, Clonan was based in the Serb held town of Prijedor. Back at home, he completed a master's degree in Communications at the Dublin City University (DCU) and joined the Defence Forces Press Office (DFPO) as a press officer.

Research on female personnel in the Defence Forces
Between 1996 and 2000 Clonan was given formal written sanction – by the Chief of Staff and the Director of Training at Defence Forces Headquarters – to undertake a PhD at DCU as the first equality audit of the Irish military, titled "The Status and Roles Assigned Female Personnel in the Permanent Defence Forces". The findings revealed a catalogue of discrimination, bullying, sexual harassment and assault within the Irish Defence Forces against female soldiers and led to an independent government inquiry which resulted in an overhaul in the workplace policies of the DF and the implementation of recommendations arising from the inquiry to protect equality within the Irish armed forces. Clonan was the subject of 'Whistleblower Reprisal' (as cited by Transparency International, Ireland) from senior officers for whistleblowing.

He retired from the Defence Forces in 2000.

Academic and media work
Clonan lectures at the Technological University Dublin (TUD) School of Media in the fields of Ethics, Journalism, Political Communication, Public Affairs and Research Methodology.

He has been a security analyst for The Irish Times from the September 11 attacks in 2001 to 2016, reporting and commenting on various world events involving defence, intelligence, terrorism and international relations for various news organisations. He is currently a security analyst and columnist for Irish online news platform, the Journal.ie, (2016 to date).

He is a Fellow of the US-based Armed Forces & Society publication.

Clonan's young son suffers from a rare neuromuscular disease, and as a result Clonan has campaigned on behalf of children and young people in Ireland with disabilities and brought attention to the effects austerity has had on funding for essential services to assist people with disabilities.

He is the author of two best-selling books, Blood, Sweat and Tears (2012) and Whistleblower, Soldier, Spy (2013).

In November 2019, Clonan was recognised by the Irish military authorities for his PhD research which helped transform the culture of the Irish Armed Forces with regard to Equality, Diversity and Dignity in the Workplace. Clonan was formally acknowledged and thanked for his service and contribution to the Defence Forces by the Chief of Staff, Vice Admiral Mark Mellett at the Military College, Curragh Camp in November 2019.

Political career

Clonan ran for election to the 25th Seanad in 2016 for the Dublin University constituency, but was unsuccessful. Clonan ran again in 2020, increasing his vote but the incumbent senators retained their seats.

He stood again in the 2022 Dublin University by-election, beating Maureen Gaffney on the sixteenth count.

Works

References

Year of birth missing (living people)
Living people
Alumni of Dublin City University
Alumni of Trinity College Dublin
Military personnel from Dublin (city)
The Irish Times people
20th-century Irish politicians
Members of Seanad Éireann for Dublin University
Members of the 26th Seanad
Independent members of Seanad Éireann